Kirby Muxloe Football Club is a football club based in Kirby Muxloe, Leicestershire, England.

History
The club was established in 1910. They played in the Leicester Mutual League, and were relegated from Division Two to Division Three in 1972–73. They were promoted back to Division Two in 1974–75, and were renamed Kirby Muxloe Sports and Village Club in 1975 after merging with the local cricket club. The following season saw them promoted to Division One. In 1977 the club joined the Premier Division of the Leicester City League, where they played until joining Division Two of the Leicestershire Senior League in 1982. The following year Division Two was renamed Division One.

A third-place finish in Division One in 1986–87 saw Kirby Muxloe promoted to the Premier Division. However, after finishing bottom of the Premier Division in 1988–89, the club were relegated back to Division One. They won the Division One title in 1994–95, earning promotion back to the Premier Division, where they finished as runners-up in 1997–98. They were runners-up for a second time in 2003–04 and again in 2006–07, a season that also saw them win the Leicestershire and Rutland Senior Cup. The following 2007–08 season saw the club win the Premier Division championship. They then became founder members of the East Midlands Counties League and were the league's inaugural champions in 2008–09, earning promotion to the Midland Alliance.

In 2014 the Midland Alliance merged with the Midland Combination to form the Midland League, with Kirby Muxloe placed in the Premier Division. At the end of the 2014–15 they were transferred to the Premier Division of the United Counties League. After finishing second-from-bottom of the United Counties League Premier Division in 2018–19, the club were relegated to Division One of the Midland League. At the end of the 2020–21 season they were transferred to Division One of the United Counties League.

Honours
East Midlands Counties League
Champions 2008–09
Leicestershire Senior League  
Premier Division champions 2007–08
Division One champions 1994–95
Leicestershire and Rutland Senior Cup
Winners 2006–07

Records
Best FA Cup performance: Second qualifying round, 2016–17
Best FA Vase performance: First round, 1998–99, 1999–2000, 2004–05, 2005–06, 2007–08, 2008–09, 2009–10, 2012–13, 2013–14, 2016–17

See also
Kirby Muxloe F.C. players

References

External links

Football clubs in Leicestershire
Football clubs in England
1910 establishments in England
Association football clubs established in 1910
Leicester City Football League
Leicestershire Senior League
East Midlands Counties Football League
Midland Football Alliance
Midland Football League
United Counties League